The Pro Swooping Tour (PST) is a professional competition circuit for an extreme form of parachuting called "canopy piloting".  The PST was formed in 2003 by producer Jim P. Slaton and his associate Lyle Presse.  Slaton & Lyle presented the sport's competition format and rules to the International Parachute Committee (IPC) at the 54th annual meeting in Brazil in 2003. The PST's efforts paid off and the IPC accepted the new sport of "Canopy Piloting". The PST created the competition format which gave birth to modern day canopy piloting.

Tour format
Between 2003 and 2007 the PST used a point system to determine the overall ranking of competitors. The PST champion was the pilot who accumulated the most points throughout the competition season. In 2007, the PST transitioned from a point system to an annual championship event at the end of each season. The winner of the annual championships was declared the "Pro Swooping Tour Champion" for that season.

Events introduced
 Bladerunning - 1996
 Speed - 1996
 Distance - 1998
 Accuracy - 2001
 Team Speed - 2002
 Carving Accuracy - 2002
 Freestyle - 2004
 Parabatics - future event

Achievement history
Sport accepted by the International Parachuting Committee (IPC)

Sport accepted by the United States Parachute Association (USPA)

Sport accepted into the Olympic trials

Established a ranking system

Established a set of standard rules

Established a qualification system

Created the Canopy Piloting Circuit (CPC)

Tour champions
2009-NA (comp weathered out)

2008-Nick Batsch

2007-Nick Batsch (championship event)
Jeffro Provenzano (point leader)

2006-Chris Hayes
runner up Stuart Schoenfeld

2005-Francisco Neri
runner up Kaz Sheekey

2004-Jay Moledzki
runner up Jim Slaton

2003-Clint Clawson
runner up Heath Richardson

Past tour stops
2000
Para-Performance Games-Houston, Texas

2001
Para-Performance Pro Cup-Perris, California
Para-Performance Pro Blade-Quincy, Illinois
Para-Performance Games-Perris, California

2002
Red Bull Blade Raid Blade running-Elk Meadows, Utah
Para-Performance Pro Cup-Perris, California
World Freefall Convention-Rantoul, Illinois
Para-Performance World Games-Perris, California

2003
Swoop Festival-Panama City Beach, Florida
Extreme Week-Voss, Norway
South American Open-Rio de Janeiro, Brazil
Pro Tour Open-Portland, Oregon
World Freefall Convention-Rantoul, Illinois
1st World Cup of Canopy Piloting-Perris, California
Baja Challenge-Loreto, Baja Mexico

2004
1st Freestyle Open-Perris, California
Swoop Festival-Wildwood, New Jersey
U.S. Nationals of Canopy Piloting-Perris, California
2nd Freestyle Open-Perris, California

2005
U.S. Canopy Piloting Grand Prix-Perris, California
1st Ground Launch Blade running-Isabella, California
Triple Crown of Freestyle-Atlanta, Georgia
Swoop Festival-Chicago, Illinois
U.S. Nationals of Canopy Piloting-Perris, California
CPC Championships-Denver Colorado
GL Blade running Championships-Isabella, California

2006
PST Florida Pro/Am-Lake Wales, Fl	
PST Mile Hi Canopy Cup-Longmont, Colorado
PST Air Festival Show-Longmont, Colorado

2007
PST Air Festival-Mile Hi Skydiving
Mile Hi Skydiving Longmont, CO

2008
"Swoop Week" championships
Mile Hi Skydiving Longmont, CO

2009
"Swoop Week" championships
Skydive Spaceland Houston, Texas

References

External links
 Official website

Parachuting organizations